Mars InSight Roadshow was a traveling exhibit/activity center for education and public outreach in support of the InSight Mars lander and space exploration and space science. Supported by caravan of vehicles, the roadshow functioned as an exhibit for institutions and/or events and also conducted public talks. The roadshow was staffed by people from the InSight mission,  science teams, and/or members of NASA. One of the tasks was to explain the mission and to increase awareness about research and science. The roadshow included talks, exhibits, and activities that were available at certain times and locations as the roadshow travelled to different locations.

History
In the summer of 2018, while InSight was coasting through interplanetary space, the Mars InSight roadshow toured southern California in the United States.

The roadshow visited Turtle Bay Exploration Park.

On April 28, 2018 it visited the Cal Poly (California Polytechnic State University),
and on April 29, 2018 Mars InSight Roadshow visited the San Luis Obispo Children's Museum. The roadshow also visited the Santa Maria Discovery Museum, and the Orange Country Discovery Cube.

Summer of 2018 tours and location in Southern California (examples):
June 29-July 1, 2018: Santa Ana
Discovery Cube Orange County
July 4, 2018 : Pasadena
AmericaFest at the Rose Bowl
August 3–5, 2018: San Diego
San Diego Air & Space Museum

In August 2018, the Mars InSight Roadshow visited the visitor center of the Goldstone Deep Space Communications array for two days.

On September 20 and 21st of 2018 the roadshow visited Silicon Valley.

Exhibits and staff

Examples of exhibits in the traveling roadshow included:
Make Your Own Marsquake interactive featurette
Selfie stations
Scale models of the InSight spacecraft and of planet Mars
Virtual reality headsets with displays of Mars

Roadshow staff included:
InSight mission and science staff
NASA's Mars public engagement team from JPL
NASA Solar System Ambassadors

References

External links
NASA - NASA Mars Mission Tours California  - March 14, 2018

InSight
Traveling exhibits
2018 in science